Löhnberg is a municipality north of Weilburg in Limburg-Weilburg district in Hesse, Germany.

Geography

Location 
Löhnberg lies between Wetzlar and the district seat of Limburg an der Lahn.

Neighbouring communities 
Löhnberg borders in the north on the community of Greifenstein, in the east on the towns of Leun and Braunfels (all three in the Lahn-Dill-Kreis), in the south on the town of Weilburg, and in the west on the communities of Merenberg and Mengerskirchen (all three in Limburg-Weilburg).

Constituent communities 
Löhnberg's Ortsteile are Löhnberg (administrative seat), Niedershausen, Obershausen and Selters.

History 
All three constituent communities had their first documentary mention in the late 13th or early 14th century, although in Selters's case it is rather unclear as the village has the same name as both Selters in Rhineland-Palatinate and Selters in the Taunus. A document from 1317, however, can unequivocally be said to refer to Selters an der Lahn, now the Löhnberg constituent community, although it seems likely that the place might have been mentioned earlier. In 1324, the Laneburg, a castle belonging to Nassau, was first mentioned. It must have been built shortly before that. At that time, Löhnberg's main centre was still called Heimau and was granted under this name town rights in 1321. However, the new town had its growth stunted because it lay so near Weilburg and also because it was pledged in 1344 to the Nassau line whose seat was there. The Laneburg had its own church by 1342 and as of 1355 a priest. In the Reformation, the community became Evangelical. In the late 16th century, the Laneburg was converted into a Renaissance palace and for a short time was a Nassau-Dillenburg residence. In 1900, the castle was gutted by fire.

The constituent community of Obershausen had its first documentary mention in 1310, and Niedershausen in 1296.

Within the framework of administrative reform in Hesse in the 1970s, the formerly autonomous communities of Löhnberg, Niedershausen, Obershausen and Selters an der Lahn, which had belonged to the old Oberlahnkreis, merged into a new collective community of Löhnberg.

Politics

Community council 

The municipal election held on 26 March 2006 yielded the following results:

Town partnerships 
Löhnberg maintains partnership arrangements with the following places:
 Ostermundigen, Bern, Switzerland since 1979
  Auleben, Thuringia, Germany

Sightseeing

Museums 
 Lahneburgmuseum für Geologie und Paläontologie

Buildings
Laneburg castle ruins are in Löhnberg, dating back to the 13th Century and significant to coin collectors for the hoard of old currency discovered during restoration work in the year 2000.  Löhnberg also has a Protestant castle church from 1738 and the Catholic church of Saint Hedwig.

Economy and infrastructure 
On the edge of Löhnberg nearest the village of Selters is the bottling plant for Selters mineral water, sourced from its well on site and sold both in Germany and abroad.

Transport 

Through the community runs Bundesstraße 49 (Limburg - Wetzlar).

Löhnberg has a railway station, part of the Lahntal railway.

Education 
In Löhnberg there is one primary school named Grundschule auf dem Falkenflug. The nearest secondary schools are in Weilburg.

Public institutions 
 Kindergarten HABAKUK Löhnberg
 Kindergarten "Kleine Strolche" Niedershausen
 Löhnberg Volunteer Fire Brigade, founded 1901 (includes Youth Fire Brigade)
 Niedershausen Volunteer Fire Brigade, founded 1901 (includes Youth Fire Brigade)
 Obershausen Volunteer Fire Brigade, founded 1934 (includes Youth Fire Brigade)
 Selters Volunteer Fire Brigade, founded 1934

Famous people 
 Hermine Spies-Hardtmuth (b. 25 February 1857 in Löhnberger Hütte; d. 26 February 1893 in Wiesbaden) was a German opera singer. She was said to be one of Europe’s leading contraltos and an outstanding interpreter of works by Johannes Brahms, with whom she was friends.
 Wilhelm Kremer. He was Mayor of Löhnberg and Hessian State Chairman of the VdK (service club for the handicapped, chronically ill, elderly).

References

External links 

 Löhnberg 
 

Limburg-Weilburg